A scientific technique is any systematic way of obtaining information about a scientific nature or to obtain a desired material or product.

Scientific techniques can be divided in many different groups, e.g.:

 Preparative techniques
 Synthesis techniques, e.g. the use of Grignard reagents in organic chemistry
 Growth techniques, e.g. crystal growth or cell cultures in biology
 Purification techniques e.g. those in chemistry
 Measurement techniques
 Analysis techniques, e.g. ones that reveal atomic or molecular composition.
 Characterization techniques, e.g. ones that measure a certain property of a material.
 Imaging techniques, e.g. microscopy

In some cases these methods have evolved into instrumental techniques that require expensive equipment. This is particularly true in sciences like physics, chemistry, and astronomy. It is customary to abbreviate the names of techniques into acronyms, although this does not hold for all of them. Particularly the advent of the computer has led to a true proliferation in the number of techniques to the point that few scientists still have a good overview over all that is available. See, for example, the list of materials analysis methods and :Category:Scientific techniques.

See also
 Protocol (natural sciences)
 Scientific method